Dennis James Stark (born October 27, 1974) is an American former Major League Baseball (MLB) right-handed pitcher who played with the Seattle Mariners across two separate stints, as well as for the Colorado Rockies, from 1999 to 2009.

Amateur career 
A native of Edgerton, Ohio, Stark attended Edgerton High School and the University of Toledo. In 1995 he played collegiate summer baseball with the Wareham Gatemen of the Cape Cod Baseball League.

Professional career

Seattle Mariners
Drafted by the Seattle Mariners in the 4th round of the 1996 Major League Baseball Draft, Stark would make his Major League Baseball debut with the Mariners on September 15, .

Colorado Rockies
On December 16, 2001, the Mariners traded Stark with Brian Fuentes and José Paniagua to the Colorado Rockies for Jeff Cirillo. In  Stark saw his best year statistically to date. Playing for the Colorado Rockies he went 11–4 with a 4.00 ERA in 32 games, 20 of those were starts. Stark's career started to decline from here, in  he appeared in 17 games, 13 started, and had a record of 3–3 with a 5.83 ERA.

Cleveland Indians
After his tumultuous season in 2004, Stark signed a minor league deal with the Cleveland Indians. Stark pitched in Spring Training but never made the team and was shut down for the season due to an elbow injury.

Stark missed the entire 2006 and 2007 seasons after undergoing two Tommy John surgeries.

Seattle Mariners, second tenure
On March 8, he signed a minor league contract with the Seattle Mariners. He spent the season working his way back into pitching shape pitching for the Mariners' Double-A affiliate, the West Tenn Diamond Jaxx, and Triple-A affiliate, Tacoma Rainiers. He was re-signed by the Mariners at the end of the season. He made his first major league appearance since  on May 3,  when he pitched  of an inning against the Oakland Athletics.  He was designated for assignment by the Mariners on June 7, 2009. Stark was granted free agency on October 15, 2009.

Bridgeport Bluefish
Stark played for the Bridgeport Bluefish of the Atlantic League of Professional Baseball in 2010.

References

External links

1974 births
Living people
Seattle Mariners players
Colorado Rockies players
Major League Baseball pitchers
Baseball players from Ohio
People from Williams County, Ohio
Toledo Rockets baseball players
Everett AquaSox players
Wisconsin Timber Rattlers players
Lancaster JetHawks players
Arizona League Mariners players
New Haven Ravens players
San Antonio Missions players
Tacoma Rainiers players
Colorado Springs Sky Sox players
Visalia Oaks players
Tulsa Drillers players
Buffalo Bisons (minor league) players
West Tennessee Diamond Jaxx players
Bridgeport Bluefish players
Wareham Gatemen players